Antonius Franciscus Cornelis "Anton" Toscani (29 July 1901 – 1 November 1984) was a Dutch race walker who specialized in the 50 km. In this event, he finished tenth at the 1936 Summer Olympics and eighth at the 1938 European Championships.

References

1901 births
1984 deaths
Dutch male racewalkers
Athletes (track and field) at the 1936 Summer Olympics
Olympic athletes of the Netherlands
Athletes from Amsterdam